KNM ER 3733 is a fossilized hominid cranium of the extinct hominid Homo ergaster, alternatively referred to as African Homo erectus. It was discovered in 1975 in Koobi Fora, Kenya, right next to Lake Turkana, in a survey led by  Richard Leakey, by a field worker called Bernard Ngeneo.

KNM ER 3733 is one of the oldest Homo ergaster skulls in the world.  Recent research using magnetostratigraphy has determined the age of KNM-ER 3733 to be  million years old.

KNM ER 3733 is a find of a near-complete cranium. Its brain size is about 850ccm. KNM ER 3733 was compared to male fossils KNM ER 3883 and KNM WT 15000 (Turkana Boy), who were also found at the Koobi Fora site, and because of this, is said to be female. The features of KNM ER 3733 are less robust compared to the two male crania. It is considered an adult because of the extensive wear of its teeth, the fact that its third molars were present before the individual died, and because its cranial sutures were fully fused, which is only possible in adult specimen.

See also
 List of fossil sites
 List of human evolution fossils
  KNM WT 15000 ("Turkana Boy")
 KNM-ER 1470 (Homo rudolfensis)

Notes

References

External links

Archaeology Info

Homo ergaster fossils
Prehistoric Kenya
1975 archaeological discoveries
1975 in Kenya